Mark Christian Wotte (born 16 December 1960) is a Dutch football manager and former player. Wotte has managed teams in the Netherlands, Egypt, Qatar, England and Romania, and has also worked for the Scottish Football Association.

Playing career
Wotte played for Sportclub Enschede and FC Twente Academy, The Netherlands U.17's, and 1st Team Football for Feyenoord Rotterdam, FC Vlaardingen, FC Den Haag and SVV Schiedam in his native Netherlands. Injuries ended his career in 1986.

Coaching and management career
In 1996, he was named manager of ADO Den Haag, where he stayed for two seasons, before signing for FC Utrecht (1997–2000). He later worked for FC Den Bosch, Willem II Tilburg, the Royal Dutch Football Association, Feyenoord Rotterdam (technical director), and Ismaily SC in Egypt. He left Ismaily SC on 16 December 2006 due to family reasons, to return to the Netherlands to coach RKC Waalwijk before moving to Qatar to manage Al Ahli.

Southampton
Having initially been linked with Southampton in 2005, Wotte joined the club as part of the new management team in 2008, with particular responsibility for the development of Southampton's youth squad. He was appointed manager on 23 January 2009, replacing Jan Poortvliet. Southampton drew 2–2 against Norwich City in his first game in charge.

Defeats against Sheffield United and Bristol City left the Saints in relegation trouble. Wins against Preston North End, Cardiff City and Ipswich Town gave Southampton hope, but the club went into administration, due to financial problems. The resulting ten-points deduction confirmed their relegation to League One. Wotte left the club after it was taken over by Markus Liebherr in the summer of 2009.

Universitatea Craiova
Wotte signed a one and a half year contract with Romania's Liga I team Universitatea Craiova on 7 January 2010. He led the team on a good run, which contained victories against Rapid București, Vaslui, Poli Iași, Brașov and Astra Ploiești. However, after losing two home games he was suspended on 10 May 2010 for 30 days, despite saving the team from relegation being 4 points clear from the relegation places. Following the suspension, Wotte got in a conflict with the Craiova's owner and left the club. In 2015 the CAS of FIFA decided the dismissal was injustice.

Ismaily
Wotte returned to Egyptian club Ismaily in June 2010. He coached his first competitive game on 18 July, in a game against Algerian side JS Kabylie in the 2010 CAF Champions League. After the public uproar in Egypt early 2011 causing temporarily postponing
of The Egyptian League Wotte stayed until April managing the team before returning to the Netherlands.

Scottish FA
Wotte was named as the first Performance Director and Technical Director of National Teams of the Scottish Football Association (SFA) on 23 June 2011. Wotte left the SFA in October 2014, having implemented most of the recommendations of a review conducted by Henry McLeish.

Morocco FA
On 1 December 2015, Wotte joined the Royal Moroccan Football Federation. He worked as the football federation's National Youth Teams Coach. He signed a four-year contract until 2020. He was responsible for players born 1997-1998 and 1999 with teams U20 and the Olympic Team U23.

In July 2017, he won for the first time since 2001 the football tournament at the 2017 Francophone Games in Abidjan by beating the home country CIV in the Final with the Morocco U20 team. In 2018 he won also gold medals with Morocco U15/16 in Algeria and Tunesia.

Al Wahda
In July 2020, Wotte signed a contract with Abu Dhabi side, Al Wahda, however due to the UAEFA postponing the Pro-League competition and after one training match, he was dismissed in September of the same year.

References

External links
 

1960 births
Footballers from Enschede
Living people
Dutch footballers
Fortuna Vlaardingen players
Feyenoord players
SV SVV players
ADO Den Haag players
Eredivisie players
Eerste Divisie players
Dutch football managers
Dutch expatriate football managers
ADO Den Haag managers
FC Utrecht managers
FC Den Bosch managers
Willem II (football club) managers
RKC Waalwijk managers
Eredivisie managers
Southampton F.C. managers
Dutch expatriate sportspeople in Egypt
Dutch expatriate sportspeople in Scotland
Al Ahli SC (Doha) managers
English Football League managers
Dutch sports executives and administrators
Association football defenders
Dutch expatriate sportspeople in England
Dutch expatriate sportspeople in Qatar
Dutch expatriate sportspeople in Morocco
Dutch expatriate sportspeople in Syria
Dutch expatriate sportspeople in Romania
FC U Craiova 1948 managers
Ismaily SC managers
Al Wahda FC managers
Expatriate football managers in Egypt
Expatriate football managers in Romania
Expatriate football managers in the United Arab Emirates
Expatriate football managers in Qatar